One Man Band is a live album by American singer-songwriter James Taylor that was released in November 2007 on Hear Music. It was recorded over several days at the Colonial Theatre in Pittsfield, Massachusetts.

Background
The premise for One Man Band is that instead of having a wide array of instruments, as with most concerts, Taylor is accompanied by only his guitar and  Larry Goldings on piano, organ, and bass. There are some exceptions, such as the pre-recorded Tanglewood Festival Chorus sings on "My Traveling Star" and "Shower the People". Also, a "drum machine" (in this case, a large mechanical device that physically plays drums) made by Taylor and his friend Gordon Fairfield appears on "Slap Leather" and "Chili Dog".

The digital discrete 5.1 surround sound mix of One Man Band won a TEC Award for best surround sound recording in 2008.

Track listing

References

James Taylor video albums
2007 live albums
2007 video albums
Live video albums
James Taylor live albums